Surgidero de Batabanó Lighthouse is a Cuban lighthouse located in Surgidero de Batabanó, a village and the port of Batabanó, Mayabeque Province.

See also

List of lighthouses in Cuba

References

Lighthouses in Cuba
Buildings and structures in Mayabeque Province
Lighthouses completed in 1847
19th-century architecture in Cuba